Jalilvand (also Romanized as Jalīlvand; also known as Ḩalīlvand) is a village in Cham Chamal Rural District, Bisotun District, Harsin County, Kermanshah Province, Iran. At the 2006 census, its population was 91, in 15 families.

References 

Populated places in Harsin County